The summer of 2014 in Sweden was unusually warm, especially in the northern parts of the country. July was the warmest ever month on record in the north-west.

Events
The July heat wave started after a week, when Härsnäs in Östergötland County recorded  after hot continental air came into the south of the country. The heat remained stabled and quite normal until the second half of the month, when heat warnings were released by the Meteorological Office. The heat affected all of Sweden, but was particularly abnormally hot in the north. The temperature record of nearby islet Holmön was beaten by more than three degrees and topped  on an outlying island north of 63 degrees latitude. Several thunderstorms struck the country in some areas at this time, with the precipitation being unevenly distributed.  fell on the same day in Motala, whilst nearby Linköping only had  of rainfall in all of July – akin to mediterranean climates.

The temperatures started to rise to new exceptional levels the final week of July and first week of August. As seen in this official picture, temperatures were a lot warmer than usual with daily means being above  in the most southerly areas, with temperatures approaching such means even far north. Even gloomy mountain areas such as Östersund and Storlien had warm months. Although the temperatures in the mountain ranges topped  on average, more significant though was that both locations significantly bettered the July sunshine records.

In August the heat wave in the far north got somewhat tempered, but for the first week the heatwave got new proportions in the southern and central parts of Sweden. After a few relatively calm days around  a high-pressure system originating in the Baltic states came into the eastern parts of the country on 3 August, ensuring new nationwide high temperatures for the heatwave, although not matching the historic all-time highs. The highest overnight low was reached on 3 August on the uninhabited isolated island of Gotska Sandön with  a mere 0.1 °C below the nationwide all-time record for warmest low.

Following this event, the heat cooled off and August in general was quite normal in terms of temperatures, with plentiful of precipitation. The warm waters surrounding Sweden during the autumn still led to thunderstorms happening as late as early November, something that is highly unusual.

Milestones
Several heat records were broken and the summer was unusually warm by such northerly marine standards. Apart from in neighbouring countries the heatwave was very much localised, and average temperatures were somewhat neutered by cooler spells interrupting the various intense bursts of heat, as well as the cool nights in Sweden that bring average temperatures down. In a Swedish context this was still a remarkable event, in particular the extremely warm temperatures far north. The all-time record of the  mean for Linköping a 100 years earlier did however stand.

The warm and dry local weather also contributed to intense wildfires in Västmanland County in early August that took several weeks to get under proper control.

With the heat wave as a contributing factor along with the following mild autumn, 2014 was the warmest year on record in Stockholm, Gothenburg and Malmö – the three largest cities in the country. Among other unusual consequences of the heat wave was that Kiruna had a yearly mean of just above the freezing point, and Luleå's mean topping  for the first time.

Regions

Skåne

Its marine features rendered less severe daytime heat during the heat wave, but rather very warm nights. Daily July means went above , but the temperature record and individual monthly record both stood, with Falsterbo only once recording  in its recorded history (as of 2016). In spite of the hypermarine features of the climate Falsterbo recorded 20 days above  during the summer. In the wake of the heat wave Falsterbo had an October average low of the very mild .

Lund in Skåne had its warmest year on record, but its extremely warm July still did not match its 2006 record for the warmest month. Lund recorded 33 days with temperatures above . Unlike areas further north, Lund did not experience a summer drought.

Eastern Götaland
Norrköping and the surrounding coastline through Västervik to the south Nyköping to the east had a very warm summer in spite of the near-coastal location. Although the year was record warm, July did not beat the 1994 records, but it was still far warmer than a normal year. In total, 32 days of the year reached  in Norrköping.

Svealand

Its July was also the hottest in Sweden during daytime. July was so dry that it could easily be compared to mediterranean climates. August compensated for that with heavy rainfall.

Örebro, (namesake county) had a very warm year with uneven precipitation patterns, with a summer drought and heavy rainfall in many other parts of the year.

Northern Norrland

Considering the airport being in a rural setting, the urban area may well have surpassed Haparanda's 1925  reading. In spite of the high means a mere 14 days above  was recorded in Luleå. The warm temperatures both in July means and yearly means were due to the mild summer nights by the coastline.

Lycksele saw a record warm summer with an extremely hot July considering its northerly latitude with summer highs approaching . As many as 31 days reached or went above .

References

 

2014 heat waves
Heat waves in Europe
Heat wave
2014 meteorology
Heat wave 2014
July 2014 events in Europe